= Eco-enzyme =

Eco-enzyme or garbage enzyme is a enzymatic compound produced by fermenting organic waste such as fruit peels, vegetable waste, or other plant tissue with sugar and water at a ratio of 1:3:10. Products derived from eco-enzymes include disinfectants, detergents, fertilizers, pesticides, and biological catalysts for wastewater treatment.
